Andrezel is a commune in the Seine-et-Marne department in the Île-de-France region in north-central France.

History
 The Pope Martin IV was born on the territory of Andrezel.

Demographics
The inhabitants are called Andrezeliens.

Places of interest
 Park of the chateau.

See also
Communes of the Seine-et-Marne department

References

External links

1999 Land Use, from IAURIF (Institute for Urban Planning and Development of the Paris-Île-de-France région) 

Communes of Seine-et-Marne